The fourth and penultimate season of Food Wars!: Shokugeki no Soma anime television series, subtitled , was produced by J.C.Staff and directed by Yoshitomo Yonetani. The series was first broadcast in Japan on Tokyo MX. It aired from October 12, 2019 to December 28, 2019, with additional broadcasts on BS11 and Animax. In addition, AbemaTV streamed the season.

In the United States, Adult Swim's Toonami programming block began airing the English dub on August 22, 2021.


Episode list

Home video releases

Japanese

English

Notes

References

External links
  
 

Food Wars!: Shokugeki no Soma episode lists
2019 Japanese television seasons